Givaldo Barbosa and Ivan Kley were the defending champions, but none competed this year.

Anders Järryd and Joakim Nyström won the title by defeating Jesús Colás and David de Miguel 6–2, 6–2 in the final.

Seeds

Draw

Draw

References

External links
 Official results archive (ATP)
 Official results archive (ITF)

Madrid Tennis Grand Prix
1986 Grand Prix (tennis)